CarVup is a platform game published by Core Design in 1990. The game, which is based on City Connection, was available for the Amiga and Atari ST.

Gameplay
The gameplay involves controlling a cartoon-like car called Arnie, jumping from platform to platform and avoiding enemies. If the level's time limit was reached, a demon-like creature called Turbo was released which homed in on the player within 15 seconds, costing them a life.

The objective of the game was to drive over every platform in the level, which changed the platforms in some way. For example, in the construction zone the platforms are girders with holes for rivets. A rivet would appear in the hole once it was driven over. With this task completed, Arnie would be picked up by a helicopter and taken to the next level. At the end of three levels, Arnie would rescue an animal friend and continue on to the next themed level.

Themed levels include: construction site, Halloween, garden and other various themes.

Development
Both the Amiga and Atari ST versions of CarVup began development in May 1990, and were released in November. CarVup's protagonist, Arnie, was initially named Carl. The game's plot was conceived before the team decided on a car protagonist; Robert Toon, CarVup's designer & programmer, stated that the team decided on an automotive aesthetic because "people can associate with cars and, because it has no brakes, it's easy to explain why it doesn't stop moving". CarVup was inspired by the similarly colorful & cartoony platformers Rainbow Islands and Rod Land; Terry Lloyd, CarVup's graphic artist, expressed that he wanted to have cartoon visuals without making them 'too simplistic'. Toon further expressed that CarVup was made to look "like it came from a console or arcade game". Most of CarVup's graphics were created in OCP Art Studio on an Atari ST, and larger works such as the title screen were created in DEGAS Elite. Memory limitations impacted CarVup's graphic design, limiting the number of frames each animation could have; this also impacted Arnie's sprite, and making it 'stand out' despite the sprite's small size was a priority. Arnie was planned to have more facial expressions, but this was scrapped due to memory constraints. Parallax scrolling is unique to the Amiga version of CarVup, and isn't present in the Atari ST version.

Reception
The One gave the Atari ST version of CarVup an overall score of 90%, praising its 'arcade-style' presentation accentuated by its "cute" graphics, as well as its "simplistic" and "tremendous[ly] fun" gameplay. The One praised CarVup's level design, which when combined with the game's enemy AI, created a challenge which requires skill. The One further praised CarVup's "wonderfully colourful" graphics, as well as its "jolly" music.

See also
City Connection

References

External links
CarVup at Hall of Light Amiga database

CarVup at Lemon Amiga
CarVup at Atari Mania

1990 video games
Amiga games
Atari ST games
Core Design games
Europe-exclusive video games
Platform games
Video game clones
Video games developed in the United Kingdom
Video games scored by Matthew Simmonds